Penny Ramsey (25 June 1947 – 11 February 2009) was an Australian character actress.

Her work is featured in over three decades  of classic Australian TV series. Her credits include Prisoner, The Bush Gang, Matlock Police, Homicide, Number 96, The Box, Division 4, Mrs. Finnegan, Riptide and Anything Goes.

Filmography

FILM

TELEVISION

Personal life
Her partner was the Australian actor Rod Mullinar, she was the daughter of Cuthbert Ramsey and actress Lois Ramsey.

Ramsey died of unspecified cancer in 2009, aged 61.

References

External links

2009 deaths
1947 births
Australian film actresses
Australian soap opera actresses
Actresses from Adelaide
Deaths from cancer in Victoria (Australia)
20th-century Australian actresses